The Ministry of Economy and Finance (Ministerio del Poder Popular de Economía y Finanzas, in Spanish, literally, "Ministry of People's Power for the Economy and Finance") is a ministry of the government of Venezuela with similar portfolios dating back to 1810 with the creation of a tax office. When Gran Colombia was dissolved and Venezuela assumed its independence, the Ministry of Finance was created in 1830 when General José Antonio Páez commissioned the establishment of the public business office to three Secretariats of State: Interior, Justice and Police, War and Navy, Finance, and Foreign Relations. The current minister has been Delcy Rodríguez since September 2020.

Ministers of Finance when part Gran Colombia 
Manuel Palacios Fajardo, 1819
Pedro Gual Escandón, 1819-1821
Luis Eduardo Azuela, 1821
José María del Castillo y Rada, 1821-1828
Nicolas M. Tanco, 1828-1829
José Ignacio de Márquez, 1830
Gerónimo Mendoza, 1830

Ministers of Finance of Venezuela 
Diego Bautista Urbaneja, 1830
Santos Michelena, 1830-1833
Pedro Pablo Díaz, 1833-1834
Santos Michelena, 1834-1835
José Luis Ramos, 1835
José E. Gallegos, 1835-1836
Santos Michelena, 1837
José Félix Blanco, 1847
Fermín Toro, 1847
Diego Antonio Caballero, 1848-1849
Ramón Yépez, 1849
José Rafael Revenga, 1849
Jacinto Gutiérrez Martínez, 1849
Francisco Olavarría, 1849-1850
Manuel Machín Quintero, 1850
Vicente Lecuna, 1850
José María de Heres, 1850
Esteban Ibarra, 1850-1851
Francisco Aranda, 1851
Pedro Carlos Gellineau, 1851-1852
José del Carmen Betancourt, 1852
Pio Ceballos, 1853-1855
Jacinto Gutiérrez Martínez, 1855-1857
Rafael Arvelo, 1858
Fermín Toro, 1858
Miguel Herrera, 1858-1859
Pedro de las Casas, 1859
Manuel M. Echendia, 1859
Eduardo Calcaño, 1859
Manuel Cadenas Delgado, 1859
Luis Irribarren, 1860
Eduardo Calcaño, 1860
Enrique Pérez Velazco, 1860
Manuel Cadenas Delgado, 1860-1861
Manuel Antonio Carreño, 1861
Francisco Madriz, 1861
Hilarión Nadal, 1861
Pedro José Rojas, 1862-1863
Antonio Guzmán Blanco, 1863-1864
Guillermo Iribarren, 1864
Octaviano Urdaneta, 1864
Santiago Goiticoa, 1864
José D. Landaeta, 1865-1866
Rafael Arvelo, 1866
J. M. Álvarez de Lugo, 1866
Lucio Pulido, 1867
Nicolas Gutiérrez, 1867
Carlos Engelke, 1868
Antonio Guzmán Blanco, 1868
Wenceslao Urrutia, 1868
Marcos Santana, 1868-1869
Eduardo Calcaño, 1869
Rafael Martínez, 1869
Ramón Francia, 1869
Ramón Azpúrua, 1869-1870
Sixto Sánchez, 1870
Juan Francisco Galindo, 1870 
Miguel Aristeguieta, 1870
Jacinto Gutiérrez, 1870-1872
Santiago Goiticoa, 1872-1873
Vicente Coronado, 1873-1874
Santiago Goiticoa, 1874-1875
Vicente Coronado, 1875-1876
Pedro Toledo Bermúdez, 1876-1877
Adolfo Urdaneta, 1877
Juan Bautista Vidal, 1877
Raimundo Andueza Palacio, 1877-1878
Trinidad Celis Ávila, 1878
Joaquin Díaz, 1878
Modesto Urbaneja, 1879
José Antonio Zapata, 1879
Fernando Adames, 1879
Ildefonso Riera Aguinagalde, 1879
Diego Jugo Ramírez, 1879
Juan Pablo Rojas Paúl, 1879-1884
Francisco Rivas Castillo, 1884-1886
Juan Francisco Castillo, 1886
Andrés María Caballero, 1886
Pedro Pablo Azpúrua Huizi, 1886-1887
Fulgencio M. Carias, 1887
Juan Pablo Rojas Paúl, 1887
Pedro Ramos, 1888
Vicente Coronado, 1888
Julio S. García, 1888-1889
José María Lares, 1889-1890
Vicente Coronado, 1890-1891
Santos Escobar, 1892
Manuel Antonio Matos, 1892
Lorenzo Adrián Arreaza, 1892
Silvestre Pacheco Jurado, 1892
Juan Pietri Pietri, 1892-1893
José Antonio Velutini, 1893
Fabricio Conde, 1893-1895
Enrique Pérez B., 1895
Manuel Antonio Matos, 1895
Andrés María Caballero, 1895
Enrique Pérez B., 1895-1896
Claudio Bruzual Serra, 1896-1897
Andrés María Caballero, 1897
Luis A. Castillo, 1897
Andrés María Caballero, 1897
Jorge Uslar, 1897
Santos Escobar, 1897-1898
Manuel Antonio Matos, 1898
Santos Escobar, 1898-1899
José Antonio Olavarría, 1899
Santos Escobar, 1899
Juan Pablo Rojas Paúl, 1899
Ramón Tello Mendoza, 1899-1903
José Cecilio De Castro, 1903-1906
Gustavo J. Sanabria, 1906
Eduardo Celis, 1906-1907
Ricardo Álvarez de Lugo, 1907
Arnaldo Morales, 1907-1908
Jesus Munoz Tebar, 1908-1909
Juan José Herrera Toro, 1909
Abel Santos, 1909-1910
Manuel Porras Echenagucia, 1910
Antonio Pimentel, 1910-1912
Manuel Porras Echenagucia, 1912
Román Cárdenas, 1913-1922
Melchor Centeno Grau, 1922-1929
Rafael María Velasco, 1929-1930
José María García, 1930-1931
Efraín González, 1931-1936
Gustavo Herrera, 1936
Alejandro Lara, 1936
Alberto Adriani, 1936
Atilano Carnevali, 1936-1937
Cristóbal L. Mendoza, 1937-1938
Francisco Parra, 1938-1941
Alfredo Machado Hernández, 1941-1943
Arturo Uslar Pietri, 1943
Rodolfo Rojas, 1943-1945
Alfonso Espinoza, 1945
Carlos D’Ascoli, 1945-1947
Manuel Pérez Guerrero, 1947-1948
Aurelio Arreaza Arreaza, 1948-1953
Pedro Guzmán Rivera, 1953-1958
José Antonio Giacopini Zárraga, 1958
Arturo Sosa, 1958 
José Antonio Mayobre, 1958-1960 
Tomás Enrique Carrillo Batalla, 1960-1961 
Andrés Germán Otero, 1961-1965 
Eddie Morales Crespo, 1965-1967 
Benito Raúl Losada, 1967-1968 
Francisco Mendoza, junior, 1968-1969 
Pedro Tinoco, 1969-1972
Luis Enrique Oberto, 1972-1974 
Héctor Hurtado Navarro, 1974-1977 
Luis José Silva Luongo, 1977-1979 
Luis Ugueto Arismendi, 1979-1983 
Arturo Sosa, 1982-1984 
Rafael Sánchez Agüero, 1984-1987 
Héctor Hurtado Navarro, 1988-1989 
Eglé Iturbe de Blanco, 1989-1990 
Roberto Pocaterra Silva, 1990-1992 
Pedro Rosas Bravo, 1992-1993 
Carlos Rafael Silva, 1993-1994 
Julio Sosa Rodríguez, 1994-1995 
Luis Raúl Matos Azócar, 1995-1997 
Freddy Rojas Parra, 1997-1998 
Maritza Izaguirre, 1998-1999 
José Alejandro Rojas, 1999-2000 
Nelson Merentes, 2001-2002
Francisco Usón, 2002 
Tobías Nóbrega, 2002-2004 
Nelson Merentes, 2004-2007 
Rodrigo Cabeza Morales, 2007-2008 
Rafael Isea, 2008 
Alí Rodríguez Araque, 2008-2010 
Jorge Giordani, 2010-2013 
Nelson Merentes, 2013-2014
Rodolfo Clemente Marco Torres, 2014-2016
Rodolfo Medina del Río, 2016-2017
Ramón Augusto Lobo Moreno, 2017
Simón Zerpa, 2017-2020 
Delcy Rodríguez, 2020-

See also
Economy of Venezuela

References

Venezuela
Government ministries of Venezuela
Economy of Venezuela
Ministries established in 1830
1830 establishments in Venezuela